Chinese philosophy originates in the Spring and Autumn period and Warring States period, during a period known as the "Hundred Schools of Thought", which was characterized by significant intellectual and cultural developments. Although much of Chinese philosophy begun in the Warring States period, elements of Chinese philosophy have existed for several thousand years. Some can be found in the I Ching (the Book of Changes), an ancient compendium of divination, which dates back to at least 672 BCE. 

It was during the Warring States era that what Sima Tan termed the major philosophical schools of China—Confucianism, Legalism, and Taoism—arose, along with philosophies that later fell into obscurity, like Agriculturalism, Mohism, Chinese Naturalism, and the Logicians. Even in modern society, Confucianism is still the creed of etiquette for Chinese society.

Chinese philosophy as a philosophy

The debate over whether the thought of ancient Chinese masters should be called philosophy has been discussed since the introduction of this academic discipline into China. See Legitimacy of Chinese philosophy for details.

Early beliefs
Early Shang dynasty thought was based upon cycles. Like the 10 stems and 12 earthly branches. This notion stems from what the people of the Shang Dynasty could observe around them: day and night cycled, the seasons progressed again and again, and even the moon waxed and waned until it waxed again. Thus, this notion, which remained relevant throughout Chinese history, reflects the order of nature. In juxtaposition, it also marks a fundamental distinction from western philosophy, in which the dominant view of time is a linear progression. During the Shang, Ancestor worship was present and universally recognized.

When the Shang were overthrown by the Zhou a new political, religious and philosophical concept was introduced called the Mandate of Heaven,This mandate was said to be taken when rulers became unworthy of their position and provided a justification for Zhou rule it is said that the Duke of zhou made the early solar terms by measuring with a gnomon that was added to make the complete solar terms he is also said to have used try squares and wrote Zhou bi with his astrologer several early beliefs might be found in the guicang and perhaps the earliest Chinese book, the small calendar of the Xia in Da Dai Liji, though debated to exist the Xia Dynasty is said to be its origin.

Overview
Confucianism developed during the Spring and Autumn period from the teachings of the Chinese philosopher Confucius (551–479 BCE), who considered himself a retransmitter of Zhou values. His philosophy concerns the fields of ethics and politics, emphasizing personal and governmental morality, correctness of social relationships, justice, traditionalism, and sincerity. The Analects stress the importance of ritual, but also the importance of 'ren', which loosely translates as 'human-heartedness', Confucianism, along with Legalism, is responsible for creating the world's first meritocracy, which holds that one's status should be determined by education and character rather than ancestry, wealth, or friendship. Confucianism was and continues to be a major influence in Chinese culture, the state of China and the surrounding areas of East Asia.

Before the Han dynasty the largest rivals to Confucianism were Chinese Legalism, and Mohism. Confucianism largely became the dominant philosophical school of China during the early Han dynasty following the replacement of its contemporary, the more Taoist Huang-Lao. Legalism as a coherent philosophy disappeared largely due to its relationship with the unpopular authoritarian rule of Qin Shi Huang, however, many of its ideas and institutions would continue to influence Chinese philosophy throughout the han dynasty and after.

Mohism, though initially popular due to its emphasis on brotherly love versus harsh Legalism, fell out of favour during the Han Dynasty due to the efforts of Confucians in establishing their views as political orthodoxy.  The Six Dynasties era saw the rise of the Xuanxue philosophical school and the maturation of Chinese Buddhism, which had entered China from India during the Late Han Dynasties. By the time of the Tang dynasty five-hundred years after Buddhism's arrival into China, it had transformed into a thoroughly Chinese religious philosophy dominated by the school of Zen Buddhism. Neo-Confucianism became highly popular during the Song dynasty and Ming Dynasty due in large part to the eventual combination of Confucian and Buddhist and even Taoist Philosophy.

During the 19th and 20th centuries, Chinese philosophy integrated concepts from Western philosophy. Anti-Qing dynasty revolutionaries, involved in the Xinhai Revolution, saw Western philosophy as an alternative to traditional philosophical schools; students in the May Fourth Movement called for completely abolishing the old imperial institutions and practices of China.  During this era, Chinese scholars attempted to incorporate Western philosophical ideologies such as democracy, Marxism, socialism, liberalism, republicanism, anarchism and nationalism into Chinese philosophy. The most notable examples are Sun Yat-Sen's Three Principles of the People ideology and Mao Zedong's Maoism, a variant of Marxism–Leninism. In the modern People's Republic of China, the official ideology is Deng Xiaoping's "market economy socialism".

Although the People's Republic of China has been historically hostile to the philosophy of ancient China, the influences of past are still deeply ingrained in the Chinese culture. In the post-Chinese economic reform era, modern Chinese philosophy has reappeared in forms such as New Confucianism. As in Japan, philosophy in China has become a melting pot of ideas. It accepts new concepts, while attempting also to accord old beliefs their due. Chinese philosophy still carries profound influence amongst the people of East Asia, and even Southeast Asia.

Ancient philosophy

Spring and Autumn period  

Around 500 BCE, after the Zhou state weakened and China moved into the Spring and Autumn period, the classic period of Chinese philosophy began. This is known as the Hundred Schools of Thought (zhūzǐ bǎijiā; "various scholars, hundred schools"). This period is considered the golden age of Chinese philosophy. Of the many schools founded at this time and during the subsequent Warring States period, the four most influential ones were Confucianism, Daoism (often spelled "Taoism"), Mohism and Legalism.

Confucianism 

Confucianism is a philosophical school developed from the teachings of Confucius collected and written by his disciples after his death in The Analects, and in the Warring States period, Mencius in The Mencius and Xunzi in The Xunzi. It is a system of moral, social, political, and religious thought that has had tremendous influence on Chinese history, thought, and culture down to the 20th century. Some Westerners have considered it to have been the "state religion" of imperial China because of its lasting influence on Asian culture. Its influence also spread to Korea, Japan, Vietnam and many other Asian countries.

Confucianism reached its peak of influence during the Tang and Song Dynasties under a rebranded Confucianism called Neo-Confucianism. Confucius expanded on the already present ideas of Chinese religion and culture to reflect the time period and environment of political chaos during the Warring States period. Because Confucius embedded the Chinese culture so heavily into his philosophy it was able to resonate with the people of China. This high approval of Confucianism can be seen through the reverence of Confucius in modern-day China.

The major Confucian concepts include rén  (humanity or humaneness), zhèngmíng  (rectification of names; e.g. a ruler who rules unjustly is no longer a ruler and may be dethroned), zhōng  (loyalty), xiào  (filial piety), and li  (ritual). Confucius taught both positive and negative versions of the Golden Rule. The concepts yin and yang represent two opposing forces that are permanently in conflict with each other, leading to perpetual contradiction and change. The Confucian idea of "Rid of the two ends, take the middle" is a Chinese equivalent of the idea of "thesis, antithesis, and synthesis", often attributed to Hegel, which is a way of reconciling opposites, arriving at some middle ground combining the best of both. 

Confucius heavily emphasized the idea of microcosms in society (subunits of family and community) success's were the foundations for a successful state or country. Confucius believed in the use of education to further knowledge the people in ethics, societal behavior, and reverence in other humans. With the combination of education, successful family, and his ethical teachings he believed he could govern a well established society in China.

Taoism 

Taoism arose as a philosophy and later also developed into a religion based on the texts the Tao Te Ching (Dào Dé Jīng; ascribed to Lao Tzu) and the Zhuangzi (partly ascribed to Zhuang Zhou). The character Dao  literally means 'path' or 'way'. However, in Taoism it refers more often to a meta-physical force that encompasses the entire universe but which cannot be described nor felt. 

All major Chinese philosophical schools have investigated the correct Way to go about a moral life, but in Taoism it takes on the most abstract meanings, leading this school to be named after it. It advocated nonaction (wu wei), the strength of softness, spontaneity, and relativism. Although it serves as a rival to Confucianism, a school of active morality, this rivalry is compromised and given perspective by the idiom "practice Confucianism on the outside, Taoism on the inside."

Most of Taoism's focus is on the notion that human attempts to make the world better actually make the world worse. Therefore, it is better to strive for harmony, minimising potentially harmful interference with nature or in human affairs.

Warring States period

Legalism 

Philosopher Han Fei synthesized together earlier the methods of his predecessors, which famous historian Sima Tan posthumously termed Legalism. With an essential principle like "when the epoch changed, the ways changed", late pre-Han Dynasty reformers emphasized rule by law.

In Han Fei's philosophy, a ruler should govern his subjects by the following trinity:
Fa ( fǎ): law or principle.
Shu ( shù): method, tactic, art, or statecraft.
Shi ( shì): legitimacy, power, or charisma.

What has been termed by some as the intrastate Realpolitik of the Warring States period was highly progressive, and extremely critical of the Confucian and Mohist schools. But that of the Qin dynasty would be blamed for creating a totalitarian society, thereby experiencing decline. Its main motto is: "Set clear strict laws, or deliver harsh punishment". In Han Fei's philosophy the ruler possessed authority regarding reward and penalty, enacted through law. Shang Yang and Han Fei promoted absolute adherence to the law, regardless of the circumstances or the person. Ministers were only to be rewarded if their words were accurate to the results of their proposals. Legalism, in accordance with Shang Yang's interpretation, could encourage the state to be a militaristic autarky.

Naturalists

The School of Naturalists or the School of Yin-yang was a Warring States era philosophy that synthesized the concepts of yin-yang and the Wu Xing; Zou Yan is considered the founder of this school. His theory attempted to explain the universe in terms of basic forces in nature: the complementary agents of yin (dark, cold, female, negative) and yang (light, hot, male, positive) and the Five Elements or Five Phases (water, fire, wood, metal, and earth). 

In its early days, this theory was most strongly associated with the states of Yan and Qi. In later periods, these epistemological theories came to hold significance in both philosophy and popular belief.  This school was absorbed into Taoism's alchemic and magical dimensions as well as into the Chinese medical framework. The earliest surviving recordings of this are in the Ma Wang Dui texts and Huang Di Nei Jing.

Mohism 

Mohism (Moism), founded by Mozi, promotes universal love with the aim of mutual benefit. Everyone must love each other equally and impartially to avoid conflict and war. Mozi was strongly against Confucian ritual, instead emphasizing pragmatic survival through farming, fortification, and statecraft. Tradition is inconsistent, and human beings need an extra-traditional guide to identify which traditions are acceptable. The moral guide must then promote and encourage social behaviors that maximize general benefit. As motivation for his theory, Mozi brought in the Will of Heaven, but rather than being religious his philosophy parallels utilitarianism.

Logicians 

The logicians (School of Names) were concerned with logic, paradoxes, names and actuality (similar to Confucian rectification of names). The logician Hui Shi was a friendly rival to Zhuangzi, arguing against Taoism in a light-hearted and humorous manner. Another logician, Gongsun Long, originated the famous When a White Horse is Not a Horse dialogue.

Agriculturalists 

Agriculturalism was an early agrarian social and political philosophy that advocated peasant utopian communalism and egalitarianism. The philosophy is founded on the notion that human society originates with the development of agriculture, and societies are based upon "people's natural propensity to farm."

The Agriculturalists believed that the ideal government, modeled after the semi-mythical governance of Shennong, is led by a benevolent king, one who works alongside the people in tilling the fields. The Agriculturalist king is not paid by the government through its treasuries; his livelihood is derived from the profits he earns working in the fields, not his leadership. Unlike the Confucians, the Agriculturalists did not believe in the division of labour, arguing instead that the economic policies of a country need to be based upon an egalitarian self sufficiency. The Agriculturalists supported the fixing of prices, in which all similar goods, regardless of differences in quality and demand, are set at exactly the same, unchanging price.

Early Imperial era philosophy

History

Qin and Han Dynasties 

The short founder Qin dynasty, where Legalism was the official philosophy, quashed Mohist and Confucianist schools. Legalism remained influential during the early Han Dynasty under the Taoist-Realist ideology Huang-Lao until Emperor Wu of Han adopted Confucianism as official doctrine. Confucianism and Taoism became the determining forces of Chinese thought until the introduction of Buddhism.

Confucianism was particularly strong during the Han dynasty, whose greatest thinker was Dong Zhongshu, who integrated Confucianism with the thoughts of the Zhongshu School and the theory of the Five Elements. He also was a promoter of the New Text school, which considered Confucius as a divine figure and a spiritual ruler of China, who foresaw and started the evolution of the world towards the Universal Peace. 

In contrast, there was an Old Text school that advocated the use of Confucian works written in ancient language (from this comes the denomination Old Text) that were so much more reliable. In particular, they refuted the assumption of Confucius as a godlike figure and considered him as the greatest sage, but simply a human and mortal

Six Dynasties 
The 3rd and 4th centuries saw the rise of the Xuanxue (mysterious learning), also called Neo-Taoism.

Buddhism arrived in China around the 1st century AD, but it was not until the Northern and Southern, Sui and Tang dynasties that it gained considerable influence and acknowledgement. At the beginning, it was considered a sort of Taoist sect. Mahayana Buddhism was far more successful in China than its rival Hinayana, and both Indian schools and local Chinese sects arose from the 5th century. Two chiefly important monk philosophers were Sengzhao and Daosheng. But probably the most influential and original of these schools was the Chan sect, which had an even stronger impact in Japan as the Zen sect.

In the mid-Tang Buddhism reached its peak, and reportedly there were 4,600 monasteries, 40,000 hermitages and 260,500 monks and nuns. The power of the Buddhist clergy was so great and the wealth of the monasteries so impressive, that it instigated criticism from Confucian scholars, who considered Buddhism as a foreign religion. In 845 Emperor Wuzong ordered the Great Anti-Buddhist Persecution, confiscating the riches and returning monks and nuns to lay life. From then on, Buddhism lost much of its influence.

Schools of thought

Xuanxue

Xuanxue was a philosophical school that combined elements of Confucianism and Taoism to reinterpret the I Ching, Tao Te Ching, and Zhuangzi. The most important philosophers of this movement were Wang Bi, Xiang Xiu and Guo Xiang. The main question of this school was whether Being came before Not-Being (in Chinese, ming and wuming). A peculiar feature of these Taoist thinkers, like the Seven Sages of the Bamboo Grove, was the concept of feng liu (lit. wind and flow), a sort of romantic spirit which encouraged following the natural and instinctive impulse.

Buddhism 

Buddhism is a religion, a practical philosophy, and arguably a psychology, focusing on the teachings of Gautama Buddha, who lived on the Indian subcontinent most likely from the mid-6th to the early 5th century BCE. When used in a generic sense, a Buddha is generally considered to be someone who discovers the true nature of reality.

Buddhism until the 4th century AD had little impact on China but in the 4th century its teachings hybridized with those of Taoism. Buddhism brought to China the idea of many hells, where sinners went, but the deceased sinners souls could be saved by pious acts. Since Chinese traditional thought focused more on ethics rather than metaphysics, the merging of Buddhist and Taoist concepts developed several schools distinct from the originating Indian schools.  

The most prominent examples with philosophical merit are Sanlun, Tiantai, Huayan, and Chán (a.k.a. Zen). They investigate consciousness, levels of truth, whether reality is ultimately empty, and how enlightenment is to be achieved. Buddhism has a spiritual aspect that complements the action of Neo-Confucianism, with prominent Neo-Confucians advocating certain forms of meditation.

Mid to Late Imperial era philosophy

History 
Neo-Confucianism was a revived version of old Confucian principles that appeared around the Song dynasty, with Buddhist, Taoist, and Legalist features. The first philosophers, such as Shao Yong, Zhou Dunyi and Chang Zai, were cosmologists and worked on the Yi Jing. The Cheng brothers, Cheng Yi and Cheng Hao, are considered the founders of the two main schools of thought of Neo-Confucianism: the School of Principle the first, the School of Mind the latter. 

The School of Principle gained supremacy during the Song dynasty with the philosophical system elaborated by Zhu Xi, which became mainstream and officially adopted by the government for the Imperial examinations under the Yuan dynasty. The School of Mind was developed by Lu Jiuyuan, Zhu Xi's main rival, but was soon forgotten. Only during the Ming dynasty was the School of Mind revived by Wang Shouren, whose influence is equal to that of Zhu Xi. This school was particularly important in Japan.

During the Qing dynasty many philosophers objected against Neo-Confucianism and there was a return to the Han Dynasty Confucianism, and also the reprise of the controversy between Old Text and New Text. In this period also started the penetration of Western culture, but most Chinese thought that the Westerners were maybe more advanced in technology and warfare, but that China had primacy in moral and intellectual fields.

Schools of thought

Neo-Confucianism 

Despite Confucianism losing popularity to Taoism and Buddhism, Neo-Confucianism combined those ideas into a more metaphysical framework. Its concepts include li (principle, akin to Plato's forms), qi (vital or material force), tai-chi (the Great Ultimate), and xin (mind). Song dynasty philosopher Zhou Dunyi (1017–1073) is commonly seen as the first true "pioneer" of Neo-Confucianism, using Daoist metaphysics as a framework for his ethical philosophy. 

Neo-Confucianism developed both as a renaissance of traditional Confucian ideas, and as a reaction to the ideas of Buddhism and religious Daoism. Although the Neo-Confucianists denounced Buddhist metaphysics, Neo-Confucianism did borrow Daoist and Buddhist terminology and concepts.
Neo-Confucianist philosophers like Zhu Xi and Wang Yangming are seen as the most important figures of Neo-Confucianism.

Modern era 

During the Industrial and Modern Ages, Chinese philosophy had also begun to integrate concepts of Western philosophy, as steps toward modernization.  Chinese philosophy never developed the concept of human rights, so that classical Chinese lacked words for them. In 1864, W.A.P. Martin had to invent the word quanli to translate the Western concept of "rights" in the process of translating Henry Wheaton's Elements of International Law into classical Chinese.

By the time of the Xinhai Revolution in 1911, there were many calls such as the May Fourth Movement to completely abolish the old imperial institutions and practices of China.  There have been attempts to incorporate democracy, republicanism, and industrialism into Chinese philosophy, notably by Sun Yat-Sen at the beginning of the 20th century. Mao Zedong added Marxism, Stalinism, Chinese Marxist Philosophy and other communist thought.

When the Chinese Communist Party took over the reign, previous schools of thought, excepting notably Legalism, were denounced as backward, and later even purged during the Cultural Revolution, whereas their influences on Chinese thoughts remain until today. The current government of the People's Republic of China is trying to encourage a form of market socialism.

Since the radical movement of the Cultural Revolution, the Chinese government has become much more tolerant with the practice of traditional beliefs. The 1978 Constitution of the People's Republic of China guarantees "freedom of religion" with a number of restrictions. Spiritual and philosophical institutions have been allowed to be established or re-established, as long they are not perceived to be a threat to the power of the CPC. Moreover, those organizations are heavily monitored. The influences of the past are still deeply ingrained in the Chinese culture.

New Confucianism 

New Confucianism is an intellectual movement of Confucianism that began in the early 20th century in Republican China, and revived in post-Mao era contemporary communist China. It is deeply influenced by, but not identical with, the Neo-Confucianism of the Song and Ming dynasties.

Philosophers 

 Confucius, seen as the Great Master but sometimes ridiculed by Taoists.
 Mencius, Confucius' follower having idealist inspiration
 Xun Zi, another Confucius' follower, closer to realism, teacher of Han Fei and Li Si
 Zhu Xi, founder of Neo-Confucianism
 Wang Yangming, most influential proponent of xinxue or "state of mind."
 Lao Tzu, the chief of Taoist school.
 Chuang Tzu, said to be the author of the Zhuangzi.
 Liezi, said to be the author of the Liezi.
 Mozi, the founder of Mohist school.
 Shang Yang, Legalist founder and pivotal Qin reformer
 Han Fei, one of the most notable theoreticians of Legalism
 Li Si, major proponent and practitioner of Legalism

Concepts 

Although the individual philosophical schools differ considerably, they nevertheless share a common vocabulary and set of concerns.

Among the terms commonly found in Chinese philosophy are:
  Dao (the Way, or one's doctrine)
  De (virtue, power)
  Li (principle)
  Qi (vital energy or material force)
 The Tai-chi (Great Heavenly Axis) forms a unity of the two complementary polarities, Yin and Yang. The word Yin originally referred to a hillside facing away from the sun. Philosophically, it stands the dark, passive, feminine principle; whereas Yang (the hillside facing the sun) stands for the bright, active, masculine principle. Yin and Yang are not antagonistic, they alternate in inverse proportion to one another—like the rise and fall of a wave.

Among the commonalities of Chinese philosophies are:
 The tendency not to view man as separate from nature.
 Questions about the nature and existence of a monotheistic deity, which have profoundly influenced Western philosophy, have not been important in Chinese philosophies or a source of great conflict in Chinese traditional religion.
 The belief that the purpose of philosophy is primarily to serve as an ethical and practical guide.
 The political focus: most scholars of the Hundred Schools were trying to convince the ruler to behave in the way they defended.

See also

References

Further reading 
 Bo Mou (Editor), History of Chinese Philosophy, Routledge, 2009.
 
 Antonio S. Cua (Editor),  Encyclopedia of Chinese Philosophy, Routledge, 2003.
  Feng Youlan, A History of Chinese Philosophy (Princeton Paperbacks), tr. Derk Bodde, 1983.
 Herrlee Glessner Creel,  Chinese Thought, from Confucius to Mao Zedong, 1971.
  A. C. Graham, Disputers of the Tao; Philosophical Argument in Ancient China, 1989.
 Christoph Harbsmeier, Logic and Language in Ancient China, (Joseph Needham, Science and Civilisation in China, Volume 7, Part I, Cambridge University Press, 1998.
 Philip J. Ivanhoe and Bryan W. Van Norden (Editors), Readings in Classical Chinese Philosophy, 2nd edition, Indianapolis:  Hackett Publishing, 2005.
 Karyn Lai, Introduction to Chinese Philosophy, Cambridge University Press, 2008.
 Lin Yutang, The Importance of Living, William Morrow Paperbacks, 1998.
 Jana S. Rošker, Searching for the Way: Theory of Knowledge in Pre-modern and Modern Chinese Philosophy Hong Kong Chinese University Press, 2008.
 Roel Sterckx, Chinese Thought. From Confucius to Cook Ding. London: Penguin, 2019.
 Roel Sterckx, Ways of Heaven. An Introduction to Chinese Thought. New York: Basic Books, 2019.
 Justin Tiwald and Bryan W. Van Norden (Editors), Readings in Later Chinese Philosophy: Han Dynasty to the 20th Century, Indianapolis: Hackett Publishing, 2014.
 Bryan W. Van Norden,  Introduction to Classical Chinese Philosophy, Indianapolis:  Hackett Publishing, 2011.
 Arthur Waley, Three Ways of Thought in Ancient China, 1983.

External links 

 
 Article "The Chinese Concept of Space"
 Article "The Chinese Concept of Time"
 The Hundred Schools of Thought
 Chinese Text Project - Chinese philosophy texts in classical Chinese with English and modern Chinese translations
 
 Contesting Confucius Henry Zhao, New Left Review 44, March–April 2007
 Encyclopédie ou Dictionnaire raisonné des sciences, des arts et des métiers, 1751–1772, ""Philosophie des Chinois" [in French]
 Warp Weft and Way - A Group Blog of Chinese and Comparative Philosophy

 
Chinese literature
Cultural history of China